The Pointe Percée (lit.: pierced point) is the highest mountain in the Aravis range of the French Prealps in Haute-Savoie. It rises to 2753 meters and has 1643 m of prominence, and is thus is classified as an ultra prominent peak. Its first documented climb was by M. L. Maquelin of Geneva in 1865, though it was likely climbed much earlier.

See also
List of Alpine peaks by prominence

References

External links
 "Pointe Percée, France" on Peakbagger

Mountains of the Alps
Mountains of Haute-Savoie